G.655 is an international standard that describes the geometrical, mechanical, and transmission attributes of a single-mode optical fibre and cable, developed by the  Standardization Sector of the International Telecommunication Union (ITU-T) that specifies one of the most popular types of single-mode optical fiber (SMF) cable.

Standard 
The standard specifies the geometrical, mechanical, and transmission attributes of a single-mode optical fibre as well as its cable. The range of mode field diameter permitted in G.655 is 8 to 11 µm in non-zero dispersion-shifted fibre. G.655.C fibre has a maximum PMD link design value of 0.20 ps/sqrtkm, which is the lowest value recommended by ITU-T. G.655 has the cable cut-off wavelength and cable attenuation coefficients in the C and L bands.

External Links 

ITU-T Recommendation G.655

References 

ITU-T recommendations
ITU-T G Series Recommendations